Vint is a surname. Notable people with the surname include:

 Aili Vint (born 1941), Estonian graphic designer and painter
 Alan Vint (1944–2006), American character actor
 Colin Vint (born 1984), American soccer player
 James Vint (1881–?), American Socialist 
 Thomas Chalmers Vint (1894–1967), American landscape architect
 Tõnis Vint (born 1942), Estonian artist
 Toomas Vint (born 1944), Estonian painter and writer
 William Vint (1768–1834), English congregationalist minister and dissenting academy tutor

Estonian-language surnames
Surnames from nicknames